My5 (previously Five Download and later Demand 5) is the brand name of video-on-demand services offered by Channel 5 in the United Kingdom. The service went live on 26 June 2008. It is owned by Paramount Global and operated by their Paramount Networks UK & Australia division.

As Five Download, the service offered downloads in Windows Media Video format of the US imports CSI, House and Grey's Anatomy. Individual episodes could be 'rented', with some episodes available seven days before they appeared on TV.

More varied content from Channel 5's programming has become available since June 2008, with a wider prevalence of free content offered for 30 days after broadcast. In January 2009, Demand 5 began to offer content in the Flash Video format, allowing users with Apple Macintosh computers to access their content.

Web platforms

My5 website
My5 is the main source of on-demand programmes from Viacom services like Channel 5, 5Star and Pluto TV. It offers a seven-day catch-up service as well as an archive of past shows.

Facebook
My5 launched on Facebook in August 2010, becoming the first television network in the world to embed its programming into the social networking site.

SeeSaw
My5 had been available on SeeSaw since the launch of the service, with access to My5's archive of shows such as Cowboy Builders, Fifth Gear, Home and Away, Neighbours and many more. In September 2011, all My5 content was removed from SeeSaw.

TV.com
In February 2010, My5 launched on TV.com with around 250 hours of archive content as well as catch-up. This represented the first major deal for long-form content in Europe for TV.com. As part of the deal, advertising is sold by Channel 5's now-relative company CBS Interactive.

YouTube
My5 is also partly available on YouTube, launching in the United Kingdom on 4 December 2009. My5's catch-up content reaches YouTube shortly after TV transmission and users are able to browse 250 hours of the broadcaster's archive content.

Television platforms

BT Vision
Demand 5 launched on BT Vision on 7 October 2008. Demand 5 was removed from BT Vision on 6 October 2010, although the two companies continued discussions in a bid to reinstate the service, having previously stalled during contract renegotiations. The service returned to BT Vision in May 2011.

Freesat
Demand 5 is available as part of Freesat's second generation Free Time guide, having been added on 6 August 2013, offering the last seven days of programming integrated to the TV guide.

Roku
On 26 July 2013, Now TV released a Now TV-branded Roku streaming box, including a Demand 5 app. Three days after the release of the Now TV Box, Roku added Demand 5 to its own range of streaming devices. The Roku service continued to operate in the Demand 5 format until December 2018, when it was upgraded to My5.

Sky
On 26 July 2012, it was announced that Demand 5 would be added to On Demand later in the year. The service was made available on 26 September 2012.

Televisions and Blu-ray players
In September 2009, an agreement was reached to make Demand 5 is available through Sony's Blu-ray Disc players, Blu-ray home cinema systems and Smart TVs, via the BRAVIA Internet Video service.

On 13 May 2011, it was announced that Demand 5 would also be available on Samsung's Smart TVs through their Samsung Smart TV service. On 16 January 2013 a Demand 5 app was launched and is available to download on Samsung Apps.

As of 2020, the My5 app is also available on Android TV, Amazon Fire TV, Apple TV and Chromecast devices.

Virgin Media
Demand 5 is available on Virgin Media's cable television service, offering programmes for 7 days after broadcast since November 2010.

In late 2019 it was confirmed that, as part of a wider deal with ViacomCBS, the full My5 app, along with the UK version of Pluto TV and subscription service MTV Play would be made available on Virgin Media.

YouView
Demand 5 was one of four services available at the launch of YouView in July 2012. At launch the Demand 5 app contained options to resume watching recent programmes, access favourites, browse featured programmes or a full list of shows, find similar programmes or more episodes and an integrated search bar.

Game consoles

PlayStation
An application for Sony PlayStation 3 owners was made available on 9 April 2013, PlayStation 4 in November 2013, and PlayStation 5 in November 2020.

From December 2018, the Demand 5 app was retired from all platforms and replaced by My5.

Xbox
On 5 October 2011, it was announced that My5 (Demand 5 at the time) would be made available on Xbox 360 and was later made available on Xbox One

As with the PS3 app, the Demand 5 Xbox app was retired in December 2018.

Mobile platforms

iOS devices
A Big Brother Demand 5 app for the iPad, iPod Touch and iPhone launched on 19 August 2011, the app offered a 30-day catch-up service for Big Brother content. The app has been extended to incorporate catch-up content from Channel 5, 5* and 5USA, creating an overall Demand 5 app. The app is compatible with iOS 10.0 or later. Reviews of the app have been very poor due to, among other issues, that Demand 5 can only be used on Wifi networks, rather than 3G or 4G

Android
On 16 May 2013, Demand5 was launched on a range of Samsung Galaxy Android devices including smartphone and tablets.

Windows Phone
On 25 November 2013, Demand5 was launched for mobile phone handsets running the Windows Phone 8 platform.

Programming 
In addition to programming taken from Paramount Global services like BET and Pluto TV Drama, My5 used to act as the on-demand service for a number of other UK channels and programme content owners, like A+E Networks' Blaze, until Sept 30th 2021, when those agreements were voided and it became a service for content exclusive to PNUK&A networks. BET shows and specials are still available on My5 along with a number of classic MTV reality shows (such as Ex on the Beach and Geordie Shore) as My5 Exclusives, with the British BET International channel being streamed in the UK via Pluto TV.

Current live TV channels
 Channel 5
 5Star
 5USA
 5Action
 5Select

Additional My5 only programming
In addition to the channels listed above, the service includes programmes from these channels/brands:
 BET (until 2022, programmes listed in the BET section)
 MTV (certain programmes only until 2022, listed as My5 Exclusives)
 WWE

My5 Exclusives
Programmes include:
Hapless
The Arrangement
Seven Types of Ambiguity
World Without End
The Royals

Former channels
Content from a number of other channels was available until 30 September 2021:

 CBS Reality (channel co-owned with AMC Networks International)
 Horror (channel co-owned with AMC Networks International)
 Pluto TV Drama
 Pluto TV Food
 Pluto TV Movies
 Smithsonian Channel (owned by Paramount in association with the Smithsonian Institution)
 Blaze
 discover.film
 Masters of Food
 PBS America
 Real Stories
 Reel Truth Crime
 Timeline
 Together TV

See also
 Voot
 Paramount+
 Pluto TV
 BET+
 Nick+
 Noggin
 Philo
 BBC iPlayer
 ITVX
 All 4
 List of streaming media services

References

External links
My5 at Channel5.com

2008 establishments in the United Kingdom
Channel 5 (British TV channel)
Internet properties established in 2008
Video on demand services